The Tuscaloosa metropolitan area, as defined by the United States Census Bureau, is an area consisting of three counties in west central Alabama, anchored by the city of Tuscaloosa. As of the 2020 census, the MSA had a population of 268,674.

Counties

Hale
Tuscaloosa
Pickens

Communities

Places with more than 100,000 inhabitants
Tuscaloosa (Principal city)

Places with 15,000 to 25,000 inhabitants
Northport

Places with 1,000 to 5,000 inhabitants
Brookwood
Coaling
Cottondale (census-designated place)
Eutaw
Greensboro
Holt (census-designated place)
Lake View
Moundville

Places with 500 to 1,000 inhabitants
Akron
Coker
Forkland
Vance (partial)
Woodstock (partial)

Places with less than 500 inhabitants
Boligee
Newbern
Union

Unincorporated places
Crawford Fork

Demographics
As of the census of 2000, there were 192,034 people, 74,863 households, and 48,931  families residing within the MSA. The racial makeup of the MSA was 63.05% White, 34.61% African American, 0.22% Native American, 0.81% Asian, 0.03% Pacific Islander, 0.52% from other races, and 0.77% from two or more races. Hispanic or Latino of any race were 1.22% of the population.

The median income for a household in the MSA was $26,687, and the median income for a family was $33,988. Males had a median income of $29,669 versus $20,847 for females. The per capita income for the MSA was $15,115.

See also
Alabama census statistical areas

References

 
Geography of Tuscaloosa County, Alabama
Geography of Greene County, Alabama
Geography of Hale County, Alabama